José Santa Cruz may refer to:

 José Santa Cruz (boxer) (born 1980), Mexican boxer.
 José Santa Cruz (actor), Brazilian actor and comedian
 José Santa Cruz (athlete) (born 1954), Cuban athlete in the discus throw

See also 
 Jose Cruz (disambiguation)